The Derbent Synagogue, it's also known as Kele-Numaz (
) is the only synagogue in the city of Derbent, a city in the Russian Republic of Dagestan.

History
In 19th century Derbent the upper, oldest part of the city, closer to the citadel of Naryn-Kala, was primarily inhabited by Muslims, the central, flat part by Mountain Jews, and the lower part, near the sea by Armenians and Russians.

The Kele-Numaz synagogue was opened in 1914 and is under the supervision of the Federation of Jewish Communities of Russia (FJCR).

At the beginning of the Soviet era there were 11 synagogues in the city, including the Kele-Numaz.

In February 1904 the Mountain Jewish community petitioned the city authorities to allocate land for the construction of a new synagogue. The petition said that during the time of the Derbent Khanate, the Jews built a synagogue on the 2nd Komendantskaya Street (the Midrash Eliyahu synagogue), but the number of congregants had increased beyond the synagogue's capacity.

The city authorities allocated 300 square meters to the Mountain Jewish community for the construction of a prayer house at the corner of Golitsyn Street (now Buynaksk Street) and Kolodezny Lane (now Chapayev Lane).

Restoration
In 2009 the synagogue was dismantled and reconstructed using old stones and new materials. The rebuilt building is called the Jewish Community Center.

Above the main entrance of the Jewish community center a sign in Hebrew says "And let them make me a sanctuary, that I may dwell in their midst."

The total area of the Jewish Community Center is 2500 square meters. There is a mikveh, the Municipal Kindergarten and the Museum of Mountain Jews.

The synagogue reopening on March 22, 2010 was attended by the President of Dagestan Magomedsalam Magomedov and rabbi Berel Lazar.

References

Notes

External links
Jewish community of ancient Derbent
Opening of the synagogue in Derbent, March 22, 2010
Judaism in Dagestan

Orthodox synagogues in Russia
Cultural heritage monuments in Derbent
History of Derbent
Objects of cultural heritage of Russia of regional significance
Religious buildings and structures in Dagestan
Synagogues in Russia
1914 establishments